Guichen may refer to the following:

People
Luc Urbain de Bouëxic, comte de Guichen, a French naval officer

Places

Australia
Guichen Bay, a bay in South Australia
Guichen Bay Conservation Park, a protected area in South Australia

France
Guichen, a commune in northwestern France
Canton of Guichen, a canton in northwestern France

Ships
French ship Guichen, two ships of the French navy.